Steve Larsen (born January 26, 1975) is a Canadian bobsleigher. Larsen competed in the 2006 Winter Olympics. Larsen was born in Langley, British Columbia.

References

1975 births
Bobsledders at the 2006 Winter Olympics
Canadian male bobsledders
Canadian people of Norwegian descent
Living people
Olympic bobsledders of Canada
People from Langley, British Columbia (city)
Sportspeople from British Columbia